Pavel Yurevich Ruminov (born 25 November 1974) is a Russian film director. He began his career in Vladivostok directing music videos for Russian acts such as Mumiy Troll and Zemfira before relocating to Moscow. He is best known in Russia for the Internet-based hype surrounding his first feature film Dead Daughters, where he tried to marry horror and arthouse cinema effectively. The film divided critics in Russia, some praised its style and message, others found the structure of the movie to be very strange. He sold the remake rights for Dead Daughters to the Hollywood studio Gold Circle Films but no remake has been produced. His second film Circumstances, a romantic comedy with dark overtones, was released in Russia in September 2009, but failed at the box-office. In 2012 his third movie Ya Budu Ryadom won the gran-prix for the best film at 23rd open film festival Kinotavr, the largest national film festival in Russia. Besides professional cinema, Pavel also makes amateur movies of his family and friends which are available on his website at YouTube.

Ruminov once compared himself favourably to such filmmakers as Steven Spielberg, Stanley Kubrick, Jean-Luc Godard, and M. Night Shyamalan. He was the only Russian contributor to Cinema Now, Taschen's 2008 survey of contemporary cinema.

Filmography 
Dislike (2016)
Ya Budu Ryadom (I Will By Your Side) (2011)
Obstoyatelstva (Circumstances) (2008)
Myortvye docheri (Dead Daughters) (2007)
Chelovek, kotoryy molchal (Silent Man) (2004)
Kluchevoe deystvie (Deadline) (2004)
Stereoblood (2002)

External links

1974 births
Living people
Russian film directors
Russian film editors
Russian screenwriters
Male screenwriters
Russian male writers
Russian composers
Russian male composers